Annemie Bogaerts (born 25 October 1971) is a Belgian chemist known for her work in plasma chemistry, plasma-based green chemistry, which include amongst others CO2 conversion, CH4 conversion for H2 synthesis or the synthesis of hydrocarbons and N2 fixation as basis for fertilizer production, as well as for her work in plasma medicine for cancer treatment, and the use of laser ablation to sample chemicals and form plasmas. She is a full professor of chemistry at the University of Antwerp.

Education and career
Bogaerts is originally from Wilrijk, a district of Antwerp. She studied chemistry at the University of Antwerp, earning a master's degree there in 1993 and completing her Ph.D. in 1996. She remained at the University of Antwerp as a postdoctoral researcher, including some research stays abroad, until 2004, when she obtained a faculty position there. She has been a full professor since 2014.

Recognition
Bogaerts was elected to the Royal Flemish Academy of Belgium for Science and the Arts in 2011, and in the same year was also elected to the Academia Europaea. She was Francqui Distinguished Research Professor (2013-2016) and is the recipient of a prestigious European Research Council (ERC) Synergy Grant (2019-2025) on plasma-based electrification of chemical reactions, with Gabriel Centi, Volker Hessel and Evgenii Rebrov. She also obtained a prestigious ERC Proof of Concept Grant (2022). She is head of the research group PLASMANT, a large, interdisciplinary and international research group of about 50 researchers, which she built up from scratch. She is co-founder of two spin-off companies, "D-CRBN" and Optanic, based on the research of her group PLASMANT on using plasma technology for CO2 conversion and for dry reforming of methane, respectively."

References

External links
Home page

1971 births
Living people
People from Wilrijk
Belgian chemists
Belgian women chemists
University of Antwerp alumni
Academic staff of the University of Antwerp
Members of Academia Europaea